Parajapyx intermedius is a species of two-pronged bristletail in the family Parajapygidae. It is found in Central America.

References

Diplura
Articles created by Qbugbot
Animals described in 1948